Historical Roasts is an American comedy television series on Netflix. Based on the Los Angeles live comedy show of the same name, the series "roasts" historical figures including Abraham Lincoln, Martin Luther King Jr., and Cleopatra. The 6-episode first season was released on Netflix on May 27, 2019. It is hosted by Jeff Ross, a "recurring roaster" who has appeared frequently in stand-up specials and series on Comedy Central.

Episodes

Production 
On September 20, 2018, Deadline reported that Netflix had ordered 6 episodes of the series.

Reception 
Reception from critics has been mixed. For Paste, John-Michael Bond wrote "if you don't mind your comedy black, you'll find a lot to like in Historical Roasts''' silly look at the past." Others, including the Anne Frank House in Amsterdam, have criticized the "Anne Frank" episode for jokes about concentration camps, and making light of Nazi-occupied Europe. Niv Hadas of Haaretz'', an Israeli newspaper, defended the show from critics, calling the episode "compassionate, funny and historically accurate".

References

External links 
 
 

English-language Netflix original programming
Roast (comedy)
2019 American television series debuts